The women's artistic team all-around competition at the 1952 Summer Olympics was held at Messuhalli, Exhibition Hall II on 22–24 July. It was the fourth appearance of the event.

Competition format

The gymnastics format continued to use the aggregation format. Each nation entered a team of eight gymnasts. All entrants in the gymnastics competitions performed both a compulsory exercise and a voluntary exercise for each apparatus. The four apparatus that would become standard (floor, balance beam, uneven bars, and vault) were all used in the same Games for the first time. The team score consisted of the best six individual all-around scores plus the team portable apparatus score.

No separate finals were contested.

For each individual exercise, five judges gave scores from 0 to 10 in one-tenth point increments. The top and bottom scores were discarded and the remaining three scores averaged to give the exercise total. For the team portable apparatus, eight judges gave scores between 0 and 10, the top two and bottom two scores were discarded, and the remaining four scores were summed and multiplied by 2. Thus, exercise scores ranged from 0 to 10, apparatus scores from 0 to 20, individual totals from 0 to 80, team apparatus scores from 0 to 80, and team all-around scores from 0 to 540. 

For the vault, each competitor had two tries for each of the compulsory and voluntary vaults with the better score to count. For the other three apparatus exercises, the competitor had the option to make a second try only on the compulsory exercise—with the second attempt counting regardless of whether it was better than the first. For both compulsory and voluntary floor exercises, and voluntary exercises in the non-floor, non-vault apparatuses, only one attempt could be made.

Results

References

Women's artistic team all-around
1952
Women's events at the 1952 Summer Olympics